Maharaja Sir Lakshmeshwar Singh, Maharaja of Darbhanga  (25 September 1858 – 16 November 1898) was the Zamindar and principal landowner of Darbhanga in the Mithila region, presently in the State of Bihar, India. His philanthropic works, administrative abilities and management of his estate (Raj Darbhanga) were highly appreciated and lead to development of his estate.

Biography
Lakshmeshwar Singh was the eldest son of Maharaja Maheshwar Singh of Darbhanga, who died when Lakshmeshwar was aged two. The British Raj placed the estate of Darbhanga under the control of the Court of Wards because the heirs to the estate were minors.  He was placed under the tutorship of Chester Macnaghten, who later served as the founding Principal of the oldest Public school in India, the Rajkumar College, Rajkot from 1870 to 1896.

For the next 19 years, till he attained majority, he was caught in political one-upmanship between his mother, who was supported by family priests, and the Tutors appointed by the British Government, who wanted him to be free from Zenana influence. He along with his younger brother Rameshwar Singh (who became Maharaja of Darbhanga after Lakshmeshwar Singh's death) received a western education from Government appointed tutors as well as a traditional Indian education from a Sanskrit Pandit, one of his uncles, a Maulvi and a Bengali gentleman. During the period when Lakshmeshwar Singh was under the guardianship of the Court of Wards, he received a monthly allowance of Rs.5 a month even though the annual income of his estate was equivalent to a six digit figure in pounds sterling.

On attaining his majority, Lakshmeshwar Singh devoted himself entirely to public duties of his position. He was appointed and served as a Member of the Legislative Council of the Viceroy, and took a leading part in the debates of that body. During the lengthened discussions on the important Bengal Tenancy Bill, he acted (in conjunction at first with the lamented patriot, Kristodas Pal, and subsequently with the Raja Piari Mohan Mukharji, (C.S.I.) as the representative of the landowners of Bengal and Behar and received warm recognition of the ability and moderation he brought to bear on this and other questions from successive Viceroys.

He was also a member of the Royal Commission on Opium of 1895, formed by British Government along with Haridas Viharidas Desai who was the Diwan of Junagadh. The Royal Opium Commission consisted of a 9-member team of which 7 were British and 2 were Indians and its chairman was Earl Brassey.

Lakshmeshwar Singh championed freedom of speech, personal and political rights.  In 1898, he and W. C. Banerjee, were the only prominent Indians to publicly criticise and fight against the proposed widening of scope of section 124-A and 153-A of the Indian Penal Code that was meant to suppress freedom of press in reporting news that could be deemed seditious in nature or against Government policy and insertion of section 108 in Indian Penal Code that gave right to postal authorities to seize any material that was suspected of containing matter obnoxious to section 124-A and 153-A of Indian Penal Code.

Lakshmeshwar Singh died on 17 December 1898. He did not have any children and thus his younger brother, Rameshwar Singh, succeeded him as Maharaja

Public charity

Maharaja Lakshmeshwar Singh spent approximately £300,000 on relief work during the Bihar famine of 1873–74. He constructed hundreds of miles of roads in various parts of the Raj, planting them with tens of thousands of trees for the comfort of travellers, as part of generating employment for people effected by famine. He constructed iron bridges over all the navigable rivers of the Raj Darbhanga, and completed an elaborate system of irrigation works, for prevention of famine. The lakes, ponds, dams, and other water bodies created during his rule still exist today and form important part in irrigation in northern Bihar. In addition to the £300,000 expended in charitable relief during the Bihar famine of 1873–74, in every time of scarcity the late Maharaja's arrangements for meeting it were on a splendid scale, and were in many cases the models for the Government measures. He built, and entirely supported, a first-class Dispensary at Darbhanga, which cost £3400; a similar one at Kharakpur, which cost £3500 ; and largely contributed to many others.

He built an Anglo-vernacular school at a cost of £1490, which he maintained, as well as nearly thirty vernacular schools of different grades; and subsidised a much larger number of educational institutions.

Most of the late Maharaja's munificence was devoted to objects of charity pure and simple, such as famine relief, medical aid, and the like. But he also contributed very largely to objects of general public utility — as, for instance, in the gift of Rs.50,000 to the funds of the Imperial Institute. It was computed that during his possession of the Raj an aggregate sum of something like two millions sterling was expended on charities, works of public utility, and charitable remissions of rent.
The late Maharaja devoted special attention to all agricultural improvements, and especially to improvements in the breeds of horses and cattle in Bihar. He was a liberal patron of the turf, and was the owner of the largest and most valuable racing stud in India. He was also a keen sportsman.

The Maharaja was also one of the founders of Indian National Congress as well as one of the main financial contributor thereto  Maharaja Lakshmeshwar Singh is known for purchasing Lowhter Castle for the venue of the 1888 Allahabad Congress session when the british denied permission to use any public place.

Other information
He constructed Anand Bagh Palace (also called Lakshmivilas Palace, after him) at Darbhanga and became well known in England because of sketches that appeared in the city's illustrated papers. The palace was later donated by his nephew, Maharaja Kameshwar Singh, to the Government of India for use as a university to promote the Sanskrit language. It is now the head office of Maharaja Kameshwar Singh Sanskrit University. The botanical and zoological gardens that once surrounded it have vanished due to official apathy.

On the occasion of the Golden Jubilee of Great Queen Victoria, Lakshmeshwar Singh was created a Knight Commander of the Most Eminent Order of the Indian Empire, being promoted to Knight Grand Commander in 1887.

The British Governor commissioned Edward Onslow Ford to make a statue of Lakshmeshwar Singh. This is installed at Dalhousie Square in Kolkata.

References

Knights Grand Commander of the Order of the Indian Empire
1858 births
1898 deaths
Maharajas of Darbhanga
Indian knights
Indian National Congress politicians
Founders of Indian schools and colleges
Indian philanthropists
Indian Hindus
Indian royalty